The Wazir Khan Mosque (Punjabi and ; ; Masjid Wazīr Khān) is a 17th-century mosque located in the city of Lahore, capital of the Pakistani province of Punjab. The mosque was commissioned during the reign of the Mughal Emperor Shah Jahan as a part of an ensemble of buildings that also included the nearby Shahi Hammam baths. Construction of Wazir Khan Mosque began in 1634 C.E., and was completed in 1641. It is on the UNESCO World Heritage Tentative List.

Considered to be the most ornately decorated Mughal-era mosque, Wazir Khan Mosque is renowned for its intricate faience tile work known as kashi-kari, as well as its interior surfaces that are almost entirely embellished with elaborate Mughal-era frescoes. The mosque has been under extensive restoration since 2009 under the direction of the Aga Khan Trust for Culture and the Government of Punjab, with contributions from the governments of Germany, Norway, and the United States.

Location 

The mosque is located in the Walled City of Lahore along the southern side of Lahore's Shahi Guzargah, or "Royal Road," which was the traditional route traversed by Mughal nobles on their way to royal residences at the Lahore Fort. The mosque is situated approximately 260 metres west of the Delhi Gate, where the mosque's Shahi Hammam is located. The mosque also faces a town square known as Wazir Khan Chowk, and the Chitta Gate. The mosque hosts the shrine of Saint Sakhi Saif Souf.

Background
The mosque was commissioned by the chief physician to the Mughal Court, Hakeem Ilam-ud-din Ansari, who was widely known as Hamza Ramzan. Wazir Khan later became the subahdar, or Viceroy of Punjab, and commissioned several monuments in Lahore. Wazir Khan owned substantial amounts of property near the Delhi Gate, and commissioned the Wazir Khan mosque in 1634 in order to enclose the tomb of Miran Badshah, an esteemed Sufi saint whose tomb now lies in the courtyard of the mosque. Prior to the construction of the Wazir Khan Mosque, the site had been occupied by an older shrine to the saint.

The mosque's interior was richly embellished with frescoes that synthesize Mughal and local Punjabi decorative traditions, while the exterior of the mosque was lavishly decorated with intricate Persian-style kashi-kari tile work. Wazir Khan's mosque superseded the older Maryam Zamani Mosque as the Lahore main mosque for congregational Friday prayers.

Wazir Khan's mosque was part of a larger complex that included a row of shops traditionally reserved for calligraphers and bookbinders, and the town square in front of the mosque's main entrance. The mosque also rented space to other types of merchants in the mosque's northern and eastern façades, and ran the nearby Shahi Hammam. Revenues from these sources were meant to serve as a waqf, or endowment, for the mosque's maintenance.

Main
Construction of the mosque began under the reign of Mughal Emperor Shah Jahan in either 1634 or 1635, and was completed in approximately seven years. In the late 1880s, John Lockwood Kipling, father of Rudyard Kipling, wrote about the mosque and its decorative elements in the former Journal of Indian Art. The British scholar Fred Henry Andrews noted in 1903 that the mosque had fallen into disrepair.

Architecture

The mosque is built on an elevated plinth, with the main portal opening onto the Wazir Khan Chowk. It was built with bricks laid in kankar lime.

Decorative elements
Wazir Khan mosque is renowned for its elaborate embellishment in a style which draws from the decorative traditions from several regions. While other monuments in Lahore from the Shah Jahan period feature intricate kashi-kari tile work, none match the enormous scale of the Wazir Khan Mosque.

Structure
Bricks facing the mosque's exterior are richly embellished with the Persian-style title work known as kashi-kari. Façades facing the inner courtyard are richly embellished with motifs and palette which display strong influences from 17th century Persia. Persian-style colours used include  (cobalt blue),  (cerulean), white, green, orange, yellow and purple, while Persian-influenced motifs include star-shaped flowers and grapevines. The mosque also contains motifs of cypress trees, and is the first Mughal monument to have borrowed this motif from Persia.The façade of the entry portal facing Wazir Khan Chowk is decorated with elaborate tile work and calligraphy that includes verses of the Quran, the sayings of the Prophet Muhammad, prayers for the Prophet, and calligraphic insignias. Above the iwan entrance to the main prayer hall are verses from the Quran's surah Al-Baqara written by the calligraphist Haji Yousaf Kashmiri.

Frescoes
Unlike the contemporary Shah Jahan Mosque in Sindh, the interior walls of Wazir Khan Mosque are plastered and adorned with highly detailed buon frescoes The interior decorative style is unique for Mughal-era mosques, as it combines imperial Mughal elements with local Punjabi decorative styles. The main prayer hall contains a square pavilion over which the mosque's largest dome rests - a Persian form known as Char Taq. The underside of the dome feature frescoes depicting trees in pairs, pitchers of wine, and platters of fruit, which are an allusion to the Islamic concept of Paradise.

Architectural embellishments

The arched niche at the mosque's entrance facing Wazir Khan Chowk is richly decorated with floral motifs, and features one of Lahore's first examples of a muqarna - an architectural element found at the Alhambra in Spain, as well as on several imperial mosques in Iran. The low domes over the prayer hall reflect the style of the earlier Lodi dynasty, which ruled Lahore prior to the Mughal era.

Layout

Entrance

Entry into Wazir Khan Mosque is through a large Timurid-style Iwan over a smaller portal which faces the Wazir Khan Chowk. The iwan is flanked by two projecting balconies. Above the iwan is the Arabic Islamic declaration of faith written in intricate tilework. The panels flanking the iwan contain Persian quatrains written by the calligraphist Muhammad Ali, who was a disciple of the Sufi saint Mian Mir. The panel on the right of the iwan reads: 

While the panel to the left of the iwan reads:
Entry through the small portal leads into a covered octagonal chamber which lies in the centre of the mosque's "Calligrapher's Bazaar." The octagonal chamber lies in the centre of what is the first example of the Central Asian charsu bazaar concept, or four-axis bazaar, to be introduced into South Asia. Two of the four axes are aligned as the Calligrapher's Bazaar, while the other two align in a straight line from the mosque's entry portal, to the centre of the main prayer hall.

Courtyard

Passage through the portal and octagonal chamber leads into the mosque's central courtyard. The courtyard measures approximately 160 feet by 130 feet, and features high arched galleries surrounding a central brick paved courtyard - a typical feature of imperial Persian mosques in Iran.

The mosque's courtyard contains a pool used for the Islamic ritual washing, wudu that measures 35 feet by 35 feet. The courtyard features a subterranean crypt which contains the tomb of the 14th century Sufi saint Syed Muhammad Ishaq Gazruni, also known by the name Miran Badshah.

The courtyard is flanked on four sides by 32 khanas, or small study cloisters for religious scholars. The mosque's four 107 foot tall minarets are located in each corner of the courtyard.

Main prayer hall
The mosque's prayer hall lies at the westernmost portion of the site, and is approximately 130 feet long and 42 feet wide. It is divided into five sections aligned into a single long aisle running north to south, similar to the prayer hall at the older Mosque of Mariyam Zamani Begum.

The central section of the prayer hall is topped by a 31 foot tall dome with a diameter of 23 feet resting upon four arches that form a square pavilion - a Persian architectural form known as a Char Taq. The remaining compartment in the prayer hall are topped by a 21 foot tall dome with a diameter of 19 feet, built in a style similar to that of the earlier Lodi dynasty. The northernmost and southernmost compartments also contain small cells which house spiral staircases that lead to the rooftop.

Walls of the prayer hall's interior are also decorated with calligraphy in both Arabic and Persian.
Each wall is divided further, and contain unique mosaic designs. The acoustic properties of the dome allow for the imam's sermon to be projected across the mosque's courtyard.

Conservation
The mosque complex is listed on the Protected Heritage Monuments of the Archaeology Department of Punjab. In 1993 the site was added to UNESCO's tentative list for World Heritage Site status. In 2004, the Government of Punjab embarked on conservations and restoration efforts for the mosque. In 2007, the Aga Khan Trust for Culture partnered with the Government of Punjab to restore the monument, and in 2009 began a two year long in-depth survey of the mosque as part of a larger effort to restore the Walled City of Lahore. In 2015, the site was mapped in 3D through a partnership between the Lahore University of Management Sciences and the United States Agency for International Development.

Restoration
Restoration works at Wazir Khan Mosque began in 2004.

In 2012, the Pilot Urban Conservation and Infrastructure Improvement Project—the Shahi Guzargah Project was launched by the Government of Punjab and the Aga Khan Trust for culture which restored a section of Shahi Guzargah between the mosque and Delhi Gate. The project was completed in 2015 with support from the governments of Norway and the United States of America.

Prior to completion of the project's first phase, the vicinity around the Wazir Khan mosque had been encroached upon by illegally erected shops which blocked off much of the mosque from the surrounding neighbourhood. Tangled power lines further spoiled views of the mosque, and the Wazir Khan Chowk had been badly neglected and had shrunk in size due to illegally constructed shops. The first phase of the project removed illegally constructed shops, restoring views of the mosque. Wazir Khan Chowk was extensively rehabilitated by removal of encroachments, while the well of Dina Nath was restored. Power lines along the project corridor were also placed underground, and the Chitta Gate at the eastern entrance to Wazir Khan Chowk was rehabilitated.

Gallery

Further reading
 Floral Decorations in Mughal Buildings

See also 
 Badshahi Mosque
 Shah Jahan Mosque
 Mosques of Lahore
 Walled City of Lahore
 Islamic Architecture
 Mughal architecture

References

Notes

External links 

 Lahore Photos and History
 Reading Masjid Wazir Khan, by Kamil Khan Mumtaz

Mosques completed in the 1640s
Mosques in Lahore
Mughal mosques
Walled City of Lahore
1642 establishments in Asia